Nicholas Anthony Vallelonga (born September 13, 1959) is an American actor and filmmaker. He is best known for co-writing and producing the film Green Book, for which he received two Academy Awards for Best Original Screenplay and Best Picture. He also won two Golden Globes in the same categories, as well as the PGA Award for Best Film. He has also directed the films In the Kingdom of the Blind, the Man with One Eye Is King, Choker and Stiletto, and co-wrote the screenplay to Deadfall.

Life and career
Vallelonga was born in 1959, the son of Tony and Dolores Vallelonga. He had a younger brother, Frank, who died in November 2022. He initially followed his father into acting, with minor roles in films including The Godfather, Splash, Goodfellas, and Prizzi's Honor. He made his screenwriting debut with Deadfall, directed by Christopher Coppola. While continuing his acting career, he continued to write and direct various independent films, such as A Brilliant Disguise, The Corporate Ladder, Choker, Stiletto, and Yellow Rock.

Vallelonga achieved prominence with Green Book, which he co-wrote and produced. Based on the friendship of his father and Don Shirley, Green Book was critically praised and received dozens of award nominations, although the film was not without controversy, as Shirley's family accused Vallelonga of falsifying information in the movie. In Variety, Vallelonga disputed the allegations: "There's a lot of information [the Shirley family] doesn't have, and they were hurt that I didn't speak to them. But to be quite honest with you, Don Shirley himself told me not to speak to anyone. And he only wanted certain parts of his life … So obviously, to say I didn't contact them, that was hard for me because I didn't want to betray what I promised him."

In 2019, Vallelonga apologized for a 2015 tweet that agreed with Donald Trump's claim that Muslims in Jersey City cheered when the World Trade Center towers collapsed.

Filmography

As actor
The Godfather (1972)
Splash (1984)
The Pope of Greenwich Village (1984)
Prizzi's Honor (1985)
Goodfellas (1990)
Psycho Cop 2 (1993)
Coyote Ugly (2000)
Machine (2006)
Jersey Shore Shark Attack (2012)
Vigilante Diaries (2016)
Green Book (2018)
Paydirt (2020)
The Comeback Trail (2020)
Vanquish (2021)
The Birthday Cake (2021)
Aileen Wuornos: American Boogeywoman (2021)
The Many Saints of Newark (2021)
Every Last One of Them (2021)
Monstrous (2022)

As writer
Deadfall (1993)
A Brilliant Disguise (1994)
In the Kingdom of the Blind, the Man with One Eye Is King (1995)
The Corporate Ladder (1997)
Choker (2005)
Green Book (2018)

As director
A Brilliant Disguise (1994)
In the Kingdom of the Blind, the Man with One Eye Is King (1995)
The Corporate Ladder (1997)
Choker (2005)
All In (2006)
Stiletto (2008)
Yellow Rock (2011)

As producer
A Modern Twain Story: The Prince and the Pauper (2007)
Jerseyboy Hero (2011)
Vigilante Diaries (2016)
Green Book (2018)
Black Antenna (2019)
Songs of Solomon (2020)

References

External links
 

1959 births
Living people
American people of Italian descent
American male film actors
American male television actors
American writers of Italian descent
People of Calabrian descent
Male actors from New York City
Writers from New York City
Film directors from New York City
20th-century American male actors
21st-century American male actors
Best Original Screenplay Academy Award winners
Producers who won the Best Picture Academy Award
Golden Globe Award-winning producers